Hunzikeria is a genus of flowering plants belonging to the family Solanaceae.

Its native range is Mexico and Venezuela.

The genus name of Hunzikeria is in honour of Armando Theodoro Hunziker (1919–2001), an Argentine botanist. He had specialized in the study of systems biology of the family Solanaceae.
It was first described and published by William Gerald D'Arcy in Phytologia Vol.34 on page 283 in 1976.
 
Known species, according to Kew:
Hunzikeria coulteri 
Hunzikeria steyermarkiana 
Hunzikeria texana

References

Solanaceae
Solanaceae genera
Plants described in 1976
Flora of Mexico
Flora of Venezuela